This is a timeline of Sussex history.  To read about the background to these events, see History of Sussex.  See also the list of monarchs of Sussex.

 Millennia: 1st BC1st2nd3rd 

 Centuries: 1st2nd3rd4th5th6th7th8th9th10th11th12th13th14th15th16th17th18th19th20th 21st

1st century

2nd century

3rd century

4th century

5th century

6th century

7th century

8th century

9th century

10th century

11th century

12th century

13th century

14th century

15th century

16th century

17th century

18th century

19th century

20th century

21st century

See also
 History of Sussex
 Kingdom of Sussex
 Sussex in the High Middle Ages
 History of Christianity in Sussex
 History of local government in Sussex

References

Bibliography 

 
 
 
 
 
 
 
 
 
 
 
 
 
 
 
 
 
 
 
 
 
 
 
 
 
 
 
 
 
 
 
 
 
 
 

 

 
 
 
 
 
 
 
 

 
English history timelines